The following list includes the names, locations, and categories of all the stars on the Hollywood Walk of Fame. The categories are motion pictures, television, recording, radio, and live performance. The list does not include a star's name until his or her award ceremony has taken place, not at the time of nomination or an accepted nomination.

The stars are ordered alphabetically by surname, and all names are shown as they appear on the stars. All entries can be found on the Hollywood Walk of Fame website maintained by the Hollywood Chamber of Commerce (see the External links section below). As of March 1, 2023, there are 2,751 stars on the Hollywood Walk of Fame.

A

B

C

D

E

F

G

H

I

J

K

L

M

N

O

P

Q

R

S

T

U

V

W

X

Y

Z

See also
 List of actors with Hollywood Walk of Fame motion picture stars
 List of fictional characters with stars on the Hollywood Walk of Fame

Notes

References

External links

 Hollywood Walk of Fame Starfinder at the official website
 Hollywood Star Walk: LA Times – an interactive map of star locations with photos
 Hollywood Walk of Fame interactive tour guide for mobile phones 
 Hollywood Walk of Fame interactive tour guide for PC

Hollywood Walk of Fame
Hollywood